Marian van de Wal (born 21 January 1970, Vianen) is a Dutch-Andorran singer and businesswoman who was the representative of Andorra at the 2005 Eurovision Song Contest in Kyiv, Ukraine.

Originally from the Netherlands, Van de Wal runs a small hotel in the Andorran town of L'Aldosa. She entered Eurocasting 2005, and was one of three finalists selected to go to the country's national final. On 18 December 2004, in Andorra La Vella, she won the right to sing for Andorra over Mar Capdevila and Ishtar Ruiz. Then, on 22 January 2005, in Sant Julia de Loria, Van de Wal sang three possible songs to represent Andorra, and one of those songs was to be selected by a mix of SMS vote and a local professional jury. The three songs were "No Demanis (Don't ask)", "Dóna'm La Pau (Give Me Peace)", and "La mirada interior (The Inner Glance)". La Mirada won and therefore represented Andorra in Kyiv.

Van de Wal failed to qualify for the final, during which she was accompanied by backing vocals from Anabel Conde, who ended second for Spain at the 1995 contest. She announced the Andorran votes for RTVA at the Eurovision 2007 final.

External links 
 Andorra en het Eurovisiesongfestival 
 Nederlandse Marian voor Andorra 

1970 births
Living people
Eurovision Song Contest entrants for Andorra
Eurovision Song Contest entrants of 2005
People from Vianen
Andorran women singers
Dutch emigrants to Andorra
21st-century Dutch singers
21st-century Dutch women singers